WKVE (103.1 FM "KVE") is an Album Oriented Rock formatted broadcast radio station licensed to Mount Pleasant, Pennsylvania, serving Westmoreland County, Fayette County and Southwestern Pennsylvania in particular. WKVE is owned and operated by Broadcast Communications, Inc.

History
Formerly WANB-FM, the station had been simulcasting the broadcast day of sister station WANB. The station was previously licensed to Waynesburg, Pennsylvania, USA, and obtained a construction permit to change its community of license to Mount Pleasant, Pennsylvania, raise power, and move its tower to better serve southwestern Pennsylvania.

On March 9, 2009, the call letters were changed to WKVE.  One year later, on March 9, 2010, the station silenced its Waynesburg transmitter and began broadcasting from its new facilities, repeating a "loop" directing former WANB listeners to that station's other frequencies, 1210 AM and 105.1 FM, and announcing the current format which debuted on May 4, 2010 on 103.1.

Call Sign
The WKVE callsign was originally used at WDDH in St. Mary's, Pennsylvania.  That station was built in 1986 as WKYN by Robert & Ashley Stevens and owned and operated under their corporate entity Broadcast Communications, Inc.  In the early 1990s WKYN became WKVE and aired the "KVE" album oriented rock format.  After the Stevens sold WKVE in the mid 1990s to begin acquiring stations in their hometown area, of Westmoreland County, Pennsylvania, the callsign was then subsequently used by Educational Media Foundation at one of their K-LOVE format stations, which is now WKVK, licensed to Semora, North Carolina.  Educational Media Foundation transferred the callsign WKVE back to Broadcast Communications, Inc. for use at what was then WANB-FM, which became WKVE when a major facility upgrade, including the move from Greene County to Westmoreland County was implemented.  Though similar, WKVE's callsign is not a "nod" to nearby WDVE in Pittsburgh.  The "KVE" format is a true album oriented rock format that is programmed similar to the programming style of album oriented rock formats that were very popular in the 1970s and 1980s in particular. WKVE plays some 1990's, 2000's and 2010's rock bands such as Counting Crows, Shinedown, Foo Fighters, Candlebox, 3 Doors Down, Pearl Jam and other bands that can be found on the WKVE website.

On-Air Schedule
KVE on-air personalities include Bill Korch, Lynn Bradley(news), Michael J Daniels, Doug Cannin, Caleb Michaels(Program Director), and Ashley & Ben, the roving live remote broadcasting crew. You can often hear Caleb Michael's on Saturday nights from around 6 pm to 11 pm. There's chances to win PA lottery scratch offs and other prizes given away on the air.

References

External links
103.1 KVE Online
WKVE on Facebook

KVE
Radio stations established in 1978